1st & Ten is an American sitcom that aired between December 1984 and January 1991 on the cable television network HBO. Featuring series regulars Delta Burke and veteran Reid Shelton, it was one of cable's first attempts to lure the lucrative sitcom audience away from the then-dominant "Big Three" broadcast television networks, by taking advantage of their freedom to include occasional profanity and nudity.

Plot
The sports-themed series follows the on-and off-field antics of the fictional American football team, the California Bulls. The team changed owners throughout the series' history, with the premise that a woman is in charge.

During the first season Diane Barrow (Delta Burke) becomes the owner of her ex-husband's team as part of a divorce settlement, after he has an affair with the team's tight end. She quickly learns the ups and downs of pro football. In one episode, she is forced to coach the team herself after the head coach, Ernie Denardo, is placed in the hospital. She also has constant battles with her General Manager/husband's nephew, who has dealings with the local mob, and fights off advances made by her quarterback (played by Geoffrey Scott).

The second season dealt with two themes: training camp and the playoffs. Barrow was dealing with her players taking recreational drugs during training camp. During this season, O. J. Simpson joined the cast as T.D. Parker, a veteran running back who is forced to make the transition from player to coach. Two real-life football stars made cameo appearances: Marcus Allen portrayed a rookie who was taking over T.D.'s spot on the team, and Vince Ferragamo played "Mainstreet" Manneti, a veteran quarterback. Jason Beghe joined the cast to play Tom Yinessa, a walk-on quarterback who deals with his overnight celebrity.

Delta Burke left the show midway through the third season, after committing herself exclusively to CBS' Designing Women, which she had begun starring on in 1986, and which was renewed. Diane loses control of the Bulls to Teddy Schraeder, her former lover, who manipulates everyone to his own ends. His antics include having T.D. fire Ernie as coach, letting Yinessa practice without a contract, and ignoring steroid use. Legal issues force him to leave the country and turn control over to his daughter, played by Leah Ayres.

Season 4 was briefly renamed 1st and Ten: The Bulls Mean Business. Shanna Reed joins the cast as the team's new female president, representing the new owners, the Dodds Corporation. Her attempts to innovate include bringing a female soccer player in to kick, and signing an Olympic sprinter as wide receiver. Joe Namath has a cameo appearance. Shannon Tweed would replace her in Season 5, and remain with the show to the end. The show was renamed 1st and Ten: Do it Again for the fifth season. The final season was 1st and Ten: In Your Face.

Series themes
 The Bulls somehow manage to make it to the championship football game, yet lose in a controversial, heartbreaking manner.
 Mad Dog and Dr. Death haze the rookies and rally the defense.
 Bubba and Jethro help each other with their various (often sex-related) mishaps.  Bubba's voracious appetite is also a running gag
 The volatile ownership position of the franchise.
 Controversial aspects of professional sports in the late 1980s: steroids, the instant replay, women in the locker room, the role of free agency, multi-sport stars, endorsements.

Game footage
Footage was used from USFL's Los Angeles Express. During simulated game shots, the Bulls football helmet has a decal of horns on the side. When the show uses actual game footage, you can clearly see the letters "L" and "A" on the helmets side, representing the L.A. Express. The Bulls quarterbacks wore #14 to match the actual game footage of L.A. Express real-life quarterback Tom Ramsey. Many generic shots of USFL stadiums were used to depict where the Bulls were playing. As the series went on, aerial shots were used of Los Angeles Memorial Coliseum to represent the Bulls home stadium. Game footage from the USFL stopped midway through the third season, as scripted football plays were being used instead, and the USFL had ceased operations by that point.

At one point, Denardo suggests trading for a running back. He mentions the Bulls from "that other league." He was talking about the Jacksonville Bulls from the United States Football League.

Characters
Only Donald Gibb, Cliff Frazier, Prince Hughes, and Reid Shelton appeared in all six seasons. John Kassir and O. J. Simpson joined the cast the second season and stayed till the show's end.
 Diane Barrow: Delta Burke
 Gail: Shanna Reed
 Kristy Fulbright: Shannon Tweed
 Ellen: Mariann Aalda
 Frederick 'Miracle Miles' Coolidge: Keith Amos
 Dr. Doc Phillips: Jim Antonio
 Teddy Schrader: Roy Thinnes
 Jill Schrader: Leah Ayres
 Tom Yinessa: Jason Beghe
 Johnny Valentine: Sam J. Jones
 Jethro Snell: Cliff Frazier
 Leslie 'Dr. Death' Krunchner: Donald Gibb
 Elvin Putts: Jeff Hochendoner
 Buford "Bubba" Kincaid: Prince Hughes
 Jamie Waldren: Jeff Kaake
 Zagreb Shkenusky: John Kassir
 Mac Daniels: Jay Kerr
 Roger Barrow:  Clayton Landey
 Rona Gold: Ruta Lee
 Otis: Tommy 'Tiny' Lister
 Mad Dog Smears: Tony Longo
 Deacon: John Benjamin Martin
 John Manzak: John Matuszak
 Johnny Gunn: Christopher Meloni
 Carl Witherspoon: Sam Scarber
 Bob Dorsey: Geoffrey Scott
 Coach Ernie Denardo: Reid Shelton
 Cheerleader: Tricia Pettitt
 Police officer: Ron Shipp
 T.D. Parker: O. J. Simpson
 Joe "Mainstreet" Manneti: Vince Ferragamo
 'Tombstone' Packer: Lawrence Taylor
 Mace Petty: Marshall R. Teague
 Rick Lambert: Marcus Allen
 Billy Cooper: Michael Toland
 Bulls lineman: Arthur Avant
 Bulls wide receiver: A. J. DiSpirito

Syndication and home media
At the height of the O. J. Simpson murder case, the show made its way to syndicated reruns. The complete series was released on DVD on January 24, 2006.

The original HBO versions ran for 30 minutes, while the edited-for-syndication versions ran for 22 minutes, and had some dialog and scenes edited for content, as well as the addition of a laugh-track. The majority of episodes on the "Complete Collection" DVD are the syndicated versions.

The original opening credits showed former professional football player Fran Tarkenton introducing the players and the plot points at the beginning of each episode. Completely different closing credits were originally used, too. They showed credits rolling over scenes from the episode. In syndication, these were replaced with later opening credits featuring Miracle Miles Coolidge (even though he did not join the cast until the last season) and a generic "Copyright 1991" disclaimer on a blue background respectively.

In popular culture
Outtake promos for the "championship" season with OJ and Marcus Allen were featured in the 2016 Oscar-winning documentary OJ: Made in America.

References

External links
 

1984 American television series debuts
1991 American television series endings
1980s American sitcoms
1990s American sitcoms
American football television series
English-language television shows
HBO original programming
Television shows set in California
HBO Shows (series) WITHOUT Episode info, list, or Article
Television series by The Kushner-Locke Company